Everything is Under Control: Conspiracies, Cults and Cover-ups is a reference book by Robert Anton Wilson with Miriam Joan Hill published in 1998. Arranged alphabetically, it details various conspiracy theories and the persons and events connected to them.

External links
 Full text at Internet Archive

1998 non-fiction books
Discordianism
Books by Robert Anton Wilson
HarperCollins books